"An Eye for Detail" is a 1997 Donald Duck comics story by Don Rosa. 

The story was first published in the Danish Anders And & Co. #1997-19; the first American publication was in Walt Disney's Comics and Stories #622, in March 1998.

Plot
Donald Duck is working for Scrooge McDuck by cleaning his office, and Huey, Dewey and Louie are helping him. When they are working, Scrooge notices that Donald can tell Huey, Dewey and Louie apart from each other despite them looking almost completely identical. This gives Scrooge an idea, and he takes Donald to an ophthalmologist, who diagnoses that because of Donald having lived for years with his nephews and trying to tell them apart, he has developed extraordinarily sharp eyesight, which however only works subconsciously. Scrooge decides to put this into business use, enlisting Donald as a quality inspector in his factories. However, because Donald's sharp eyesight only works subconsciously, he bumbles up his every assignment because his subconscious mind has not taken into account all of the rules. The third assignment ends in a disaster when a large steel oven that Donald had been inspecting falls down. Any large catastrophic results are avoided, but Donald decides he has had enough and feigns that he has lost his sharp eyesight, in order to return to his normal, safe job.

External links

Disney comics stories
Donald Duck comics by Don Rosa
1997 in comics